Terminalia albida is a tree species in the genus Terminalia found in West Africa. It is found in the savannah part of Bao Bolong Wetland Reserve in Gambia.

The aqueous extract of the bark is used in Gambia as an eye-lotion.

References

External links

 
 Terminalia albida at plants.jstor.org

albida
Plants described in 1894
Flora of West Tropical Africa